Silver Ridge is a locality in the Lockyer Valley Region, Queensland, Australia.

Geography 

The land use is predominantly grazing on native vegetation. Most of the residential land use is in the south-west of the locality along Flagstone Creek Road and Blanchview Road.

History 
The locality was named on 11 May 1985 and bounded on 18 February 2000.

Education 
There are no schools in Silver Ridge. The nearest government primary school is Gabbinar State School in Centenary Heights, a suburb of Toowoomba, to the north-west. The nearest government secondary school is Centenary Heights State High School, also in Centenary Heights.

References 

Lockyer Valley Region
Localities in Queensland